Astatotilapia paludinosa is a species of cichlid endemic to Tanzania where it is found in the lower Malagarasi River and the surrounding swamps.  This species can reach a length of  SL.

References

paludinosa
Freshwater fish of Africa
Fish described in 1980
Taxonomy articles created by Polbot